Safirul Sulaiman (born 12 October 1992) is a Singaporean professional footballer who plays as a left midfielder for S.League club Tampines Rovers and the Singapore national team.

Club career

Young Lions

Safirul began his professional football career at S.League club Young Lions in 2010.

LionsXII

In December 2011, the Football Association of Singapore announced that Safirul had been signed on to the newly formed LionsXII in the 2012 Malaysia Super League. He played in 7 games as the Lions finished runners-up in their debut season.

Safirul was handed the number 11 jersey at the beginning of the 2013 season. He began to see more playing time, making 16 appearances in the league as LionsXII clinched their first Malaysia Super League title.

After 2 seasons with LionsXII, Safirul failed to make the squad for the 2014 season.

Return to Young Lions

On 21 February 2014, the FAS revealed that Safirul had made a return to former club Young Lions.

Geylang International
Safirul went to sign for Geylang International for the 2016 S.League in 2016.

International career

Safirul made his international debut and first start in a friendly match against Hong Kong on 1 June 2012.

Personal life

Safirul graduated from the Singapore Sports School in 2009.

Career statistics

Club

 Young Lions and LionsXII are ineligible for qualification to AFC competitions in their respective leagues.
 Young Lions withdrew from the Singapore Cup and Singapore League Cup in 2011 due to scheduled participation in the 2011 AFF U-23 Youth Championship.

U23 International goals

Honours

Club
LionsXII
Malaysia Super League: 2013

References

External links

1992 births
Living people
Singaporean footballers
Singapore international footballers
LionsXII players
Malaysia Super League players
Singapore Premier League players
Young Lions FC players
Singaporean people of Malay descent
Association football midfielders